Ancistrus cirrhosus, the Jumbie teta, is a species of armored catfish found in the Paraná River basin of Argentina and Uruguay.  This species grows to a length of  SL.

References
 

cirrhosus
Fish of South America
Fish of Argentina
Fish of Uruguay
Fish of Trinidad and Tobago
Fish described in 1836